Mrs Dane's Defence may refer to:
 Mrs Dane's Defence (play), a 1900 play by Henry Arthur Jones
 Mrs. Dane's Defense (1918 film), an American drama silent film, based on the play
 Mrs. Dane's Defence (1933 film), a British drama film, based on the play